A Member of Parliament (MP) in Bangladesh is a member of the unicameral Jatiya Sangsad or House of the Nation. A majority of members are elected directly in general elections, while a minority of seats are reserved exclusively for women and allocated on a proportional basis. The Constitution specifies that Parliament consists of 300 directly-elected members, while 50 seats are reserved for women. The individual who leads the largest party or alliance in parliament usually becomes Prime Minister of Bangladesh.

Eligibility criteria 
In order to qualify to stand for election to Parliament, an individual is required to be –
 A citizen of Bangladesh.
 A minimum of twenty-five years of age.

Disqualification grounds 
An individual is disqualified from standing for parliament in the event they –
 Are declared by a competent court to be of unsound mind.
 Are an undischarged insolvent.
 Acquire the citizenship of a foreign state.
 Have been convicted of a criminal offence involving moral turpitude and have been sentenced to imprisonment for a period of more than two-years.
 Have been convicted of an offence under the Bangladesh Collaborators (Special Tribunals) Order, 1972.
 Hold an office of profit in service of the Republic that disqualifies them from election.
 Are disqualified from election under any law.

Term 
A Member of Parliament serves until the dissolution of parliament, which can be no more than five-years after its first sitting. But in the event of a war, parliament can pass an Act of Parliament extending the parliamentary term by no more than a year at a time. Parliament must be in session within six months of the conclusion of a war.

Duties of members of parliament 
The broad responsibilities of members of parliament include –
 Legislative responsibility, as MPs are required pass laws.
 Oversight responsibility, as MPs are required to hold the executive government to account and ensure they discharge their duties satisfactorily.
 Power of the purse, MPs are required to pass a Finance Act for each fiscal year that makes provision for the collection of revenue and expenditures of the government.

Remuneration, privileges and allowances
This is in accordance with Article 68 of the Constitution which makes provision for remuneration, allowances and privileges for members.

Size 

The Constitution specifies that Parliament consists of 300 directly-elected members from general seats elected by use of first past the post who represent single-constituencies, while 50 seats are reserved exclusively for women and are allocated on a proportional basis. After an election, the Election Commission allocates reserved seats to parties pursuant to the number of general seats they won. A party then presents a list of candidates, each requiring a presenter and a seconder. If the number of candidates presented and seats allocated is equal, then there is no election and the reserved seats are filled in accordance with the candidate lists prepared by parties. In the event there are more candidates than seat allocations, the 300 MPs elected from general seats vote through use of the single transferable vote system to determine the reserved seats. In reality, there has never been an election for reserved seats as parties have never nominated more candidates than they have been allocated.

Members 

Members of Parliament were last elected at the 2018 general election.

See also
Constitution of Bangladesh
 Jatiya Sangsad
 List of members of the 11th Jatiya Sangsad

Notes

References 

Politics of Bangladesh